Dastkari is the debut album by Pakistani band Sufi/Folk/Rock band The Sketches, released on February 5, 2010.

Track listing

"Kanton Ki Dewareen"
"Moujood"
"Justjoo"
"Doobti Aankhen"
"Dastkari"
"Ik Insan"
"Subah"
"Bhool Chukay"
"Kabhi"
"Tanhiyoon Main"
"Haq Moujood"
"Raat"

Personnel
The Sketches
Saif Samejo - lead vocals

Other albums
A new song Jogi and album YOUwas launched.

References

2010 albums
The Sketches albums